Bato, officially the Municipality of Bato,  is a 5th class municipality in the province of Catanduanes, Philippines. According to the 2020 census, it has a population of 21,748 people.

Etymology
The Spanish colonizers, who surveyed the early settlers of the area, recorded the name "Bato" and later this became the town's name. There are several unproven theories when and why the town was named "Bato", like it came from the name of the "water Wells", or it came from the Tagalog word bato, meaning "rock".  Another legend states that a Spaniard asked a settler woman the name of the settlement, and she replied "Bato". There is no certainty whether the woman understood the question or not, whether she referred to her own name or the name of the settlement itself, or to their early occupations of the area.

History

It has been known that the early Muslim settlers came from Borneo and Malaysia during the 13th century before the Spanish colonization. Many of these Muslim settlers were traders and carried their names like "Bato" who started their settlements in the area and later spread to the other regions of Visayas, Mindanao, and Luzon. Many Bato's ascendants and descendant's names originated from the three Bato's places in the Philippines (the other two being Bato, Camarines Sur, and Bato, Leyte).

Geography
Bato is located at the south-eastern portion of Catanduanes and is bounded on the north by the municipality of San Miguel; on the north-east by the municipality of Baras; on the east by the Philippine Sea; on the south by Cabugao Bay and on the west of Virac, the capital town of Catanduanes which is just  from Bato.

Geological feature
Stability and permeability of basic rock formation could be seen in the geologic map the existence of fault line along barangays Oguis, Sipi, Binanuahan, Cabugao and San Andres. These areas are considered critical especially in terms of development as urban expansion. Like other municipalities in the province of Catanduanes, Bato has many mineral deposits like gold, manganese, coal and copper.

Soil classification
The municipality of Bato is composed of five kinds of soils: hydrosol, mountain soil, alimodian clay loam, Louisiana clay, and San Miguel silt loam.

Slope
The flat lands are mostly found along the coast of Cabugao Bay along the banks of the Bato River. These flat lands with a slope of 0-3% occupies an average area of 25-30% of the entire area of Bato. The Poblacion which is located along the eastern side of the Bato River is among the barangays having this slope, characterized to be level to nearly level land. However, due to its location, the Poblacion together with the adjoining barangays frequently suffer floods. The eastern portion of Bato which faces the Pacific Ocean has a slope ranging between 3-30% slope. These areas shield the lowlands of the municipality from the incoming winds of the Pacific. These areas are mostly planted with orchards, hard wood trees and abaca.

Bato River

The Bato River stretches as far as Viga to Cabugao Bay. Once it was abundant in marine life but due to erosion and consistent flooding, the riverbed has been dumped with soil and this caused the river to get shallow and dry up. In the southern part of the Bato River is a delta, locally known as the Napo. Here farmers grow their agriculture such as peanuts, sweet potatoes, corn, beans, coconuts and palms. It is also the site for settling carabaos.

The river divides Bato into the east and west district. The Bato bridge, the longest in the Bicol region, spans the river from Baranggay Tilis to Baranggay Sipi. The old bridge is located in Baranggay Balongbong, and it was destroyed during the flooding of supertyphoon Rosing in 1995.

Barangays
Bato is politically subdivided into 27 Barangays.

 Aroyao Pequeño
 Bagumbayan
 Banawang (Poblacion)
 Batalay
 Binanwahan
 Bote
 Buenavista
 Cabugao
 Cagraray
 Carorian
 Guinobatan
 Libjo
 Marinawa
 Mintay
 Oguis
 Pananaogan
 Libod (Poblacion)
 San Andres
 San Pedro
 San Roque
 Santa Isabel
 Sibacungan
 Sipi
 Talisay
 Tamburan (Poblacion)
 Tilis
 Ilawod (Poblacion)

Climate

Like other towns in the pacific island, Bato is frequented by typhoons. This can happen up to 20 times per year, with some typhoons developing into really devastating calamities that can level entire towns. Flooding ensues in the Poblacion due to the river overflowing its banks.

Otherwise, the weather is a standard tropical weather, with the dry season settling in as early as January, and the wet season starting on June. Monsoon seasons pick up during the -ber months, in which the locals expect more typhoons to come.

Demographics

Economy

Services

Housing

With the present population of 19,269, Bato has 3,712 households, thereby placing the average family size at 5 members. It has a total of 3,667 occupied dwelling units. Of this dwelling units, 1,908 or 52.03% used concrete/brick/stone as their outer walls followed by bamboo/sawali/cogon and nipa which composes 29.42%. Asbestos/glass is the least used which accounts for only 7 houses or 0.19%.

Dwelling units have also been classified into single houses, duplex, multi-unit residential, institutional, living quarters and others. Thus of the total number of households, 99% or 3,644 occupies single house while the rest of 1% are either duplex or multi unit residential.

Health

The municipality of Bato has two major health facilities. These include one hospital and one rural health unit, which is located in Barangay Tamburan and Poblacion respectively. There used to be eight barangay health stations located in barangays Batalay, Bote, San Roque, Bagumbayan, Buenavista, Binanuahan, Sibacungan, and Cagraray.

The Bato Maternity and Children's Hospital which is under the administration of the Provincial Government of Catanduanes is catering to the needs of the three municipalities, namely: Bato, Baras, and San Miguel. It has a capacity of 50 beds whose services include consultations, admissions and minor surgeries. On the other hand, the Rural Health unit, which is under the administration of the Municipal Government of Bato, serves the needs of the 27 barangays of the municipality. Its services are medical/surgical services, laboratory services, family planning and women's health services, oral rehydration therapy, TB Control, immunization, medico legal and social services, environmental health services, pre-marriage counseling, delivery calls and nutrition services.

In 1999, the Office of the Municipal Civil Registrar posted a live birth of 307, 159 of which are males and 148 are females. Likewise it recorded 89 deaths in age group 50 years and over. The Municipal Health Office for the same year recorded a crude birth rate of 27.47% and an infant mortality rate of 0.83%.

Education

Almost 35.05% of the total population of the municipality or 7,415 comprises the school-going age population. The primary school-going population aged 6–10 years old are 2,570; the intermediate school-going population aged 11–12 years old are 993; the secondary school-going population aged 13–16 are 1,858 and the tertiary school-going population aged 17–21 are 1,994.

A survey of the actual enrollment revealed that there is an enrollment participation rate of 90.43%. This could be interpreted that for every 100 children aged 6–14 only 90 are enrolled. For secondary education out of 1,858 only 1,359 are enrolled.

A tertiary school is not present in the municipality, however post-secondary vocational courses are being offered by the school founded by then mayor, Andres T.Torres, the Cabugao School of Handicraft and Cottage Industries (CSHCI) which is now under the administration and management of the TESDA. Originally, CSHCI was established to cater free secondary education to the people of Cabugao and other neighboring barangays and municipalities.

Protective

Protective services are being served by the police force, the firemen and the barangay brigades. All in all these force totals 164, broken down as follows: 17 policemen, 4 firemen, and 143 members of the barangay brigades.

There is a single fire engine for the Bato Fire Brigade, which also responds to fires in neighbouring towns (and when the incident is really disastrous, to other distant town within the island).

Due to the absence of a PNP Building, the police station is located at the Municipal Hall. The Barangay Brigades of Bato with a force of 143 could be found all throughout the different barangays.

Social welfare

The municipality of Bato avails of the social welfare services of the government agency popularly known as the Department of Social Welfare and Development. This agency has two devolved personnel for Bato. Its services are extended to all the urban and rural barangays of the municipality and include among other: family life education and counseling, day care services, peer group service, supplemental feeding, relief rehabilitation and referral for medical care.

The organizations present in this municipalities are: Senior Citizens Organization, Women's Organization and Parents Committee. Barangay Aroyao Pequeno has the greatest number of these organizations while the rest have the same number and type of these organizations.

Sports and recreation

The present sports and recreational facilities of the municipality include billiards halls, public library, cockpit arena, basketball and volleyball courts, beaches and scenic spots as well as waterfalls resorts. Twenty-six out of twenty-seven barangays has an existing barangay plaza, which is being utilized for outdoor sports activities, community gatherings, and socialization.

References

External links

Municipality of Bato
 [ Philippine Standard Geographic Code]
Philippine Census Information

Municipalities of Catanduanes